Sebestyén Ihrig-Farkas (born 28 January 1994) is a Hungarian professional footballer who plays as a midfielder for Vasas.

Biography
Born in Budapest, capital of Hungary, Ihrig-Farkas played 3 times for the second team of Honvéd in Nemzeti Bajnokság II. On 31 January 2012, Ihrig-Farkas moved to Italian club Parma in temporary deal. On 31 August 2012, he was signed outright. Ihrig-Farkas was a player of the reserve team for  seasons.

On 1 July 2013, Ihrig-Farkas was farmed to Gorica along with Bright Addae, Daniele Bazzoffia, Uroš Celcer, Massimo Coda, Alex Cordaz, Alen Jogan, Gianluca Lapadula, Floriano Vanzo and Fabio Lebran (Crotone/Parma). The deals were finalized on 3 July. During his stay he received a red card for injuring Matej Mavrič. In late January 2014 Ihrig-Farkas left the club.

On 30 January 2022, Ihrig-Farkas signed a 1.5-year contract with Vasas.

Career statistics
.

References

External links

1994 births
Living people
Footballers from Budapest
Association football midfielders
Hungarian footballers
Budapest Honvéd FC II players
Parma Calcio 1913 players
ND Gorica players
Budapest Honvéd FC players
Kozármisleny SE footballers
Békéscsaba 1912 Előre footballers
Budafoki LC footballers
Vasas SC players
Nemzeti Bajnokság I players
Nemzeti Bajnokság II players
Slovenian PrvaLiga players
Hungarian expatriate footballers
Expatriate footballers in Italy
Expatriate footballers in Slovenia
Hungarian expatriate sportspeople in Italy
Hungarian expatriate sportspeople in Slovenia